Arthur McKean (March 13, 1882 – January 7, 1957) was an American football and basketball coach, lawyer, judge, and politician. He served as the head football coach at Geneva Collegein Beaver Falls, Pennsylvania from 1907 to 1911, compiling a record of 12–24–7. McKean served one term in the Pennsylvania House of Representatives after being elected in 1910. He was the Western Pennsylvania prohibition administrator during the presidency of Woodrow Wilson and later was a municipal judge in Orlando, Florida.

Coaching career
McKean was the sixth head football coach at Geneva College in Beaver Falls, Pennsylvania, serving for five seasons, from 1907 to 1911 and compiling a record of 10–24–7. Under McKean, the Geneva decided to join forces with five other colleges to abolish the game of football if significant rules changes were not made to make the game safer.

McKean played football and baseball at Geneva when he was a student.

Politics and law
McKean was elected to the Pennsylvania House of Representatives as a Democrat in 1910. He also served various local political positions and maintained a law practice.

Death
McKean died on January 7, 1957, at Citizens General Hospital in New Kensington, Pennsylvania.

Head coaching record

Football

References

1882 births
1957 deaths
20th-century American judges
20th-century American politicians
Geneva Golden Tornadoes baseball players
Geneva Golden Tornadoes football coaches
Geneva Golden Tornadoes football players
Geneva Golden Tornadoes men's basketball coaches
Democratic Party members of the Pennsylvania House of Representatives
People from Westmoreland County, Pennsylvania
Sportspeople from the Pittsburgh metropolitan area
Coaches of American football from Pennsylvania
Players of American football from Pennsylvania
Baseball players from Pennsylvania
Basketball coaches from Pennsylvania